The  is an AC electric multiple unit (EMU) train type operated by Hokkaido Railway Company (JR Hokkaido) on Sapporo area suburban services in Hokkaido, Japan since 1996.

Formation
, 21 three-car sets are in service, numbered G-101 to G121, and based at Sapporo Depot. The trainsets are formed as follows, with one motored intermediate car and two non-powered driving trailer cars.

Car 2 is fitted with one N-PS785 single-arm pantograph.

Interior
Seating consists of longitudinal bench seating throughout, without the vestibule areas used on the earlier 721 series trains.

History

A total of 63 vehicles (21 sets) were delivered to Sapporo Depot between 1996 and 2006. The first units entered service from 24 December 1996.

From the start of 22 March 1997 timetable revision, 731 series EMUs were operated in multiple with KiHa 201 series DMU sets over certain routes.

Polycarbonate window protectors were added in 2002, and the original pantographs were replaced with single-arm pantographs between 2004 and 2005.

Fleet history
The individual build histories of the fleet are as follows.

References

Electric multiple units of Japan
Hokkaido Railway Company
Train-related introductions in 1996
20 kV AC multiple units
Kawasaki multiple units
Hitachi multiple units